Karl Jürison (23 October 1900 Viljandi – 13 May 1953 Vorkuta, Komi Republic) was an Estonian politician. He was a member of VI Riigikogu (its Chamber of Deputies).

References

1900 births
1953 deaths
Members of the Riigivolikogu
Estonian military personnel of the Estonian War of Independence
University of Tartu alumni
Prisoners and detainees of the Soviet Union
Gulag detainees
People who died in the Gulag
People from Viljandi